The Codex Veronensis, designated by siglum b or 4 (in the Beuron system), is a 5th century Latin Gospel Book. The text, written on purple dyed vellum in silver and occasionally gold ink, is a version of the old Latin. The Gospels follow in the Western order.

Description 
The manuscript contains the Latin text of the four Gospels. It has several lacunae (Matthew 1:1-11; 15:12-23; 23:18-27; John 7:44-8:12; Luke 19:26-21:29; Mark 13:9-19; 13:24-16:20). 
In this codex, several pages are missing, including, notably, the pages which contained John 7:44-8:11.  Space-considerations show that the missing pages included John 7:53-8:11, the passage known as the Pericope Adulterae.

In Luke 8:21 it reads αυτον instead of αυτους; the reading αυτον is supported by Papyrus 75, and Minuscule 705.

In John 1:34 reads ὁ ἐκλεκτός together with the manuscripts 𝔓5, 𝔓106, א, e, ff2, syrc, s.

In John 14:14 the entire verse is omitted along with manuscripts X f1 565 1009 1365 ℓ 76 ℓ 253 vgmss syrs, pal arm geo Diatessaron.

The Latin text of the codex is a representative of the Western text-type in European recension.
In Francis Crawford Burkitt's opinion (the Divinity scholar who worked in the early 20th century), it represents the type of text that Jerome used as the basis of the Vulgate.

The manuscript was examined by Giuseppe Bianchini in the mid-18th century. The text was edited by Bianchini, Belsheim, and Jülicher.

It was named Veronensis after Verona, where it was located.

See also 

 List of New Testament Latin manuscripts
 Purple parchment

References

Further reading 

 J. Belsheim, Codex Veronensis. Quattuor Evangelia (Prague, 1904).
 G. Mercati, Un paio di appunti sopre il codice purpureo Veronese dei vangeli, RB XXXIV (1925), pp. 396–400.
 A. Jülicher, Itala. Das Neue Testament in Altlateinischer Überlieferung, Walter de Gruyter, Berlin, New York, 1976. (Marcus Evangelium)

External links 
 Image from Codex Veronensis
More information at Earlier Latin Manuscripts

Purple parchment
Gospel Books
Vetus Latina New Testament manuscripts
5th-century biblical manuscripts
5th-century illuminated manuscripts